Eik Normal School was a Norwegian school for teacher education.

History
The school was established in Horten in 1958 as the Vestfold State Normal School (Statens lærerskoleklasser i Vestfold) with H. K. Heimdal as its first chancellor. The school was renamed Eik Public Normal School (Eik offentlige lærerskole) in 1962 and Eik Normal School (Eik lærerskole) in 1967 (modified to Eik lærerhøgskole in 1981). In 1994 it became part of Vestfold University College.

Staff and alumni
 Ruth Lagesen (1914–2005), instructor at the school

References

Defunct schools in Norway
Education in Vestfold og Telemark
Horten
Educational institutions established in 1958
Educational institutions disestablished in 1994
1958 establishments in Norway